Vyatskoye is a rural locality (a selo) in Dzhanaysky Selsoviet, Krasnoyarsky District, Astrakhan Oblast, Russia. The population was 3 as of 2010. There is 1 street.

Geography 
Vyatskoye is located 22 km northwest of Krasny Yar (the district's administrative centre) by road. Verkhny Buzan is the nearest rural locality.

References 

Rural localities in Krasnoyarsky District, Astrakhan Oblast